Fields were an Anglo-Icelandic electronic/indie band formed in London in 2006. After playing their first live shows they signed a deal with Atlantic Records, which allowed them to release through their own Black Lab Records their 2007 debut album Everything Last Winter, recorded with producer Michael Beinhorn at Sun Studios in Dublin.

Vocalist Nick Peill instigated most of Fields' songs. Alongside Peill, the line-up was vocalist and keyboard player Thórunn Antonía, lead guitarist Jamie Putnam, drummer Henry Spencer, and bassist Matty Derham, who later joined Does It Offend You, Yeah?.

Fields played on tour with Wolfmother and Bloc Party, and on their own tour in 2007.

Although recording work commenced on a follow-up album to be entitled Hollow Mountain, which was intended to include the songs "Sun In Your Eyes", "Constantly", "Are You Ready Yet?", "Worst Love" and "Call The Captain", the album remains unreleased.

The band split up in 2009 after they lost their recording contract.

Former members 
 Nick Peill - vocals, acoustic guitar, keyboards
 Thórunn Antonía Magnúsdóttir - keyboards, vocals, synths
 Henry Spencer - drums, vocals
 Matty Derham - bass guitar
 Jamie Putnam - electric guitar

Discography 

Singles/EPs
"Song For The Fields", single (2006), Black Lab Records
8 From The Village EP (2006), Warner Music
4 From The Village EP (2006), Black Lab Records
7 From The Village EP (2006), Atlantic Records
"Heretic", single (2006), Black Lab Records
"If You Fail We All Fail", single (20/11/2006)
Feathers EP (2007), Atlantic Records
"Charming The Flames", single (26/03/2007), Atlantic Records

Albums
Everything Last Winter (02/04/2007), Atlantic Records/Black Lab Records

Videos
Song For The Fields (2006)
Brittlesticks (2006)
If You Fail We All Fail (2006)
Charming The Flames (2007)

References

Musical groups established in 2006
Musical groups disestablished in 2009
Atlantic Records artists